Morteza Mahfouzi (born 1986) is an Iranian football defender who plays for Aluminium Arak in the Azadegan League. 2013-2014 and 2014–15 seasons he played for the Gostaresh Foulad in Iran pro League.

Sources

References
 Morteza Mahfouzi at Persian league

Living people
1986 births
Sportspeople from Tabriz
Shahrdari Tabriz players
Gostaresh Foulad F.C. players
Niroye Zamini players
Association football defenders
Iranian footballers